Machimus elegans is a species of fly in the family Asilidae, the robber flies and assassin flies. It is found in the Near East.

References

External links 
 Machimus elegans at Fauna Europaea

Asilinae
Insects described in 1849